Walter Collymore (30 August 1856 – 23 July 1907) was a Barbadian cricketer. He played in one first-class match for the Barbados cricket team in 1883/84.

See also
 List of Barbadian representative cricketers

References

External links
 

1856 births
1907 deaths
Barbadian cricketers
Barbados cricketers
People from Saint Michael, Barbados